Gore is a rural town and locality in the Goondiwindi Region, Queensland, Australia.

Geography 
The Cunningham Highway passes through the locality from the east (Karara) to the south-west (Oman Ama). The South Western railway line also passes through the locality from the east (Karara) to the south-west (Oman Ama) roughly parallel to the highway. The town of Gore is located on the south-eastern boundary of the locality and both the highway and the railway pass through it with the town being served by Gore railway station.

The predominant land use is grazing on native vegetation.

History 

The town was named after St George Richard Gore, the original lessee of Yandilla pastoral run in 1842.

Gore State School opened on 20 January 1913. In 1927 it became Maxhill State School and then in 1937 Cement Mills State School. It closed in 1975. (The present-day locality of Cement Mills is immediately to the south-east of Gore.)

Education 
There are no schools in Gore. The nearest primary schools are Karara State School in neighbouring Karara to the north-east and Inglewood State School in Inglewood to the south-west. The nearest secondary schools are Inglewood State School (to Year 10) and Warwick State High School (to Year 12) in Warwick to the east. Given the distance to Warwick, distance education and boarding schools are other options.

Amenities 
There is a petrol station with post office facilities in the town.

References

External links 
 

Towns in Queensland
Goondiwindi Region
Localities in Queensland